Prangos is a genus of flowering plants of the family Apiaceae, native from Europe to Mongolia and the western Himalayas.

Species
, Plants of the World Online accepted the following species:
Prangos abieticola Aytaç & H.Duman
Prangos acaulis (DC.) Bornm.
Prangos akymatodes Rech.f. & Riedl
Prangos ammophila (Bunge) Pimenov & V.N.Tikhom.
Prangos aricakensis Behçet & Yapar
Prangos asperula Boiss.
Prangos bucharica O.Fedtsch.
Prangos cachroides (Schrenk) Pimenov & V.N.Tikhom.
Prangos calligonoides Rech.f.
Prangos carinata Griseb. ex Degen
Prangos cheilanthifolia Boiss.
Prangos corymbosa Boiss.
Prangos crossoptera Herrnst. & Heyn
Prangos denticulata Fisch. & C.A.Mey.
Prangos didyma (Regel) Pimenov & V.N.Tikhom.
Prangos dzhungarica Pimenov
Prangos equisetoides Kuzjmina
Prangos eriantha (DC.) Lyskov & Pimenov
Prangos fedtschenkoi (Regel & Schmalh.) Korovin
Prangos ferulacea (L.) Lindl.
Prangos gaubae (Bornm.) Herrnst. & Heyn
Prangos herderi (Regel) Herrnst. & Heyn
Prangos hermonis Boiss.
Prangos heyniae H.Duman & M.F.Watson
Prangos hulusii Şenol, Yıldırım & Seçmen
Prangos ilanae Pimenov, Akalın & Kljuykov
Prangos lachnantha (Korovin) Pimenov & Kljuykov
Prangos latiloba Korovin
Prangos ledebourii Herrnst. & Heyn
Prangos lipskyi Korovin
Prangos longistylis (Boiss.) Pimenov & Kljuykov
Prangos meliocarpoides Boiss.
Prangos multicostata Kljuykov & Lyskov
Prangos odontalgica (Pall.) Herrnst. & Heyn
Prangos ornata Kuzjmina
Prangos pabularia Lindl.
Prangos persica (Boiss.) Pimenov
Prangos peucedanifolia Fenzl
Prangos platychlaena Boiss.
Prangos scabrifolia Post & Beauverd
Prangos serpentinica (Rech.f., Aellen & Esfand.) Herrnst. & Heyn
Prangos trifida (Mill.) Herrnst. & Heyn
Prangos tschimganica O.Fedtsch.
Prangos tuberculata Boiss. & Hausskn.
Prangos turcica A.Duran, Sağiroğlu & H.Duman
Prangos uechtritzii Boiss. & Hausskn.
Prangos uloptera DC.

References

Apioideae
Taxa named by John Lindley
Apioideae genera